North Stoke is a small village beside the River Thames in the Crowmarsh civil parish in South Oxfordshire,  south of the market town of Wallingford.  Its 'Church of St Mary' is a Grade I listed building.

Parish church   
The Church of England parish church of Saint Mary was built in the 1230s when Robert de Esthall was the vicar. His memorial slab (1274) may be seen in the chancel. There are the remains of a Saxon piscina and rumours that the chest in the chancel is a 13th-century crusader chest. Most notable, however, are the large number of 14th century wall paintings.  Consequent on these factors, it is Grade I listed. The original tower collapsed in 1669 and was not rebuilt until 1725. St. Mary's parish is now a member of The Langtree Team Ministry: a Church of England benefice that also includes the parishes of Checkendon, Ipsden, Stoke Row, Whitchurch-on-Thames and Woodcote. The Ridgeway path runs through the churchyard, to either side crossing the river Thames and climbing the Chilterns.

Transport
The village is a two forked dead-end residential road against the river Thames.  However it is closer to the New Town end and has a lakeside Hotel and Golf Course which may be used by its visitors. From 6 June 2012, North Stoke is served by Go Ride bus service number 134 from Wallingford to Goring-on-Thames. Private homes and a private boathouse join the river, no public slipway is available.  The Thames Path is on the opposite bank.

Notable people
The Academy Award winning actor Michael Caine lived at Rectory Farmhouse.
The contralto Dame Clara Butt lived in the village.
Rock vocalist Ian Gillan, formerly of Deep Purple, used to live in the country house that is now the Springs Hotel. He had the guitar-shaped swimming pool built.

References

Bibliography

External links

Villages in Oxfordshire
Populated places on the River Thames
Former civil parishes in Oxfordshire